Korneyev, female form Korneyeva, is a Russian surname. In English, Korneyev and Korneyeva are sometimes also transliterated as Korneev and Korneeva.

Notable people
Notable people with this surname include:
 Aleksandr Korneev, Russian volleyball player
 Aleksey Korneyev, Russian footballer
 Andrey Korneyev, Russian swimmer
 Igor Korneev, Russian-Dutch footballer
 Konstantin Korneyev, Russian ice hockey player
 Valeri Korneyev, Russian footballer

References

Russian-language surnames